The Centre d’Études Franco-Américain de Management or Franco-American Center for Management Studies in English (commonly referred to as CEFAM), is an international business school located in Lyon, France, specializing in management, finance, consulting and marketing.

This private school was established in 1986 and offers undergraduate and graduate business degrees based on the American education system.

Accessible to students immediately after high school graduation, CEFAM allows students to study in an English language environment and to experience American culture without leaving France. Lectures are taught almost exclusively in English - exception exists for mathematics - by native speakers with strong academic backgrounds and industry experience.

CEFAM’s programs consist of a bachelor’s degree in three years in France and a year overseas in one of the American partner universities and an MBA over two years, the first in France and the second in the USA. Both the BBA and MBA programs offer a double diploma, including a French diploma certified "Niveau 7"(Master's degree level) by the French government and an AACSB accredited American degree.

The school also offers a study abroad program, giving the opportunity to American students from partner universities to study in France for a semester or a year.

Campus 

CEFAM's first campus was located at 107 rue de Marseille in Lyon. In 2004 CEFAM moved to the campus of the International Professional University René Cassin (UPIL) in Lyon. CEFAM also maintains an extensive e-Campus for students studying in Lyon and elsewhere in Europe or the United States.

Programs

Bachelor of Business Administration 

CEFAM’s undergraduate program offers an international business education right after graduating from high school. All classes are taught in English, giving the possibility to French students to become bilingual over the years. During the first three years of the Bachelor of Business Administration, students are based in Lyon. For the fourth and final year of the BBA, students are studying in one of the school partner universities where they will graduate and receive an American degree. Students also receive a French degree certified Niveau 7 by the French government. 
Students are also required to do two internships before graduating. A three-month internship by the end of the first year and a six-month internship by the end of the second year.

Master of Business Administration 

CEFAM also offers the possibility to access an MBA program with the first year in France and the second year in one of the following AACSB accredited American universities: Siena College, La Salle University, Monmouth University, or The University of Mary Washington.

Partner Universities 

Current

 Pace University, New York, NY. AACSB accredited
 Siena College, Loudonville, NY. AACSB accredited
 Temple University, Philadelphia, PA. AACSB accredited
 Rider University, Lawrenceville, NJ. AACSB accredited
 Northeastern University, Boston, MA. AACSB accredited

Previous

 Old Dominion University
 Kean University
 Valparaiso University
 Universite Laval

References

External links 
CEFAM Website

Business schools in France